Prof. Walter Lyon Blease (1884 – 12 April 1963), was a British Liberal Party politician, barrister and academic.

Background
He was born in Liverpool, the son of Walter and Mary Cecilia Blease. He was educated at Parkfield School, Liverpool; Shrewsbury School and Liverpool University. He was awarded the Studentship at Bar Final Examination, 1906. He married, in 1918, Harriott Davies. They had three daughters.

He served with hospital units in Serbia 1915 and in Russia and Romania 1916–18. He was Assistant Editor of The New East, Tokyo in 1918.

Academic career
He was Lecturer in the Law and Custom of the Constitution at Liverpool University in 1910. He was Queen Victoria Professor of Law, at Liverpool University from 1919–49.

Political career
He was Liberal candidate for the Chorley Division of Lancashire at the January 1910 General Election.

In 1936 he was appointed a Governor of the British Film Institute. 
In 1939 he was adopted as Liberal prospective parliamentary candidate for the East Toxteth Division of Liverpool. The constituency had been safe for the Conservatives during the 1930s, even without a Labour candidate to split the anti-Tory vote. By 1939 there was again no Labour candidate selected. A General Election was anticipated to take place in the Autumn of 1939 but due to the outbreak of war, the election did not take place until the 1945 General Election. By then, a Labour candidate had emerged;

He was Liberal candidate for the new Garston Division of Liverpool at the 1950 General Election.

He was Chairman of the Executive Council for Liverpool under the National Health Service Act 1946 from 1952–60. He was a Member of the Management Committee of the Executive Councils Association (England) from 1960 until his death.

He was Chairman of the Liverpool Philharmonic Society from 1950–51.

See also

References

External links 
 
 
 http://birkdalefocus.blogspot.co.uk/2010/07/brilliant-squeeze-leaflet-from-1945.html

1884 births
1963 deaths
Liberal Party (UK) parliamentary candidates
Alumni of the University of Liverpool
Academics of the University of Liverpool
People educated at Shrewsbury School
English barristers